Vicq-sur-Mer (literally Vicq on Sea) is a commune in the department of Manche, northwestern France.

Geography

Vicq-sur-Mer is located in the northwestern part of France in the region Normandy.

History

The municipality was established on 1 January 2016 by merger of the former communes of Cosqueville (the seat), Gouberville, Néville-sur-Mer and Réthoville.
The communes of  Cosqueville, Gouberville, Néville-sur-Mer and Réthoville become delegated communes.
The associated communes of Angoville-en-Saire and Vrasville disappear following the creation of the commune of Vicq-sur-Mer.

Administration

See also 
Communes of the Manche department

References 

Communes of Manche
Populated places established in 2016
2016 establishments in France
Populated coastal places in France